Yasmeen Pir Mohammad Khan is a Pakistani woman politician hailing from Saidu Sharif, Swat. Who is currently serving as a member of the Khyber Pakhtunkhwa Assembly belong to the Awami National Party (ANP). She is also serving as member of the different committees. She is serving as the member of the Khyber Pakhtunkhwa Assembly for the third time consecutively on women reserved seat.

References

Living people
Pashtun women
Khyber Pakhtunkhwa MPAs 2013–2018
Awami National Party politicians
People from Swat District
Pakistani Muslims
Year of birth missing (living people)